The 2014 Pan American Road Cycling Championships took place in Puebla, Mexico, May 8–11, 2014.

Medal summary

Men

Women

Men (under 23)

References

Americas
Cycling
Pan American Road Cycling Championships
Pan American Road and Track Championships
International cycle races hosted by Mexico